Eubranchus toledanoi is a species of sea slug or nudibranch, a marine gastropod mollusc in the family Eubranchidae.

Distribution
This species was described from Cienfuegos, Cuba.

References

Eubranchidae
Gastropods described in 2002